The Demeljoch (1,924 m) is a mountain at the border between Bavaria, Germany, and Tyrol, Austria. The summit can be reached through a hiking trail starting near the easternmost point of the Sylvensteinsee.

Mountains of Bavaria
Mountains of Tyrol (state)
Mountains of the Alps